Cruz Teng (born 18 September 1979) is a former Singaporean radio and television host. He is currently a communications professional.

He made his radio debut in 1996 at the age of 16 and hosted radio and television programmes, as well as entertainment, trade and corporate events from 1996 to 2015. He was head of Singapore’s number one radio station YES 933 from 2013 to 2015, and a four-time winner of the Most Popular Radio Personality Award. He left Mediacorp in 2015 and ventured into the corporate world, where he held several communications positions in various companies.

Education
Teng was educated at Anderson Secondary School where he took his GCE O Levels. He completed a Diploma in Business Studies at Ngee Ann Polytechnic in 1999. He enrolled in a part-time bachelor's degree course at SIM University in 2009, and completed his studies in 2012 despite a term’s absence. In 2014, he announced that he was accepted into Nanyang Technological University, to read Master of Mass Communications. He had completed the matriculation process and scored a corporate scholarship, but had to withdraw from the course when it was decided that he would return to the morning show.

Career

Media Personality

Radio Host
(1996—2002)
Cruz Teng started his freelance radio career at MediaCorp YES 933 in 1996. He continued to host weekend programmes on the station during his National Service (NS).

(2002—2013)
Upon completing NS, Cruz Teng became a full-time radio presenter and hosted the evening drive time show. He then hosted the morning show for two years, before being transferred to the night dedications show in early 2005.

He returned to the morning show by the end of 2005. He repeatedly mentioned that he was unable to adjust to the demands on the morning shift. The six-month period in the dedication show finally made him appreciate the morning programme.

The morning show was relaunched in September 2005, and a new era began as "WRM" (就是万人迷, translated at "That's a total stunner!") became the most listened to morning show across all stations and languages in Singapore.

Teng remained as the constant anchor of the morning show from 2005 to 2013.

(2013—2015)
Teng stepped down from the morning show in 2013 after being named programme director. He went on to host a 2-hour slot from 10am to 12pm on weekdays, before making a return to the morning show in late 2014. He continued to host the morning show until his departure from the station in Nov 2015.

(2016)
Cruz Teng published a blog entry to mark his 20th anniversary in radio. He remarked that "it was a shame he couldn't mark this occasion in the studios", and stressed that he "has every intention to go back on air sooner or later".

Television Host

Cruz Teng hosted a talkshow Mars Vs. Venus, Siau Jiahui on Channel U in 2015.

Stage Host
From an early stage in his career, Teng was picked to host several large scale award ceremonies.He has since hosted the Global Chinese Music Awards Ceremony in Shanghai, Taipei, Beijing and Singapore. He also hosted the Singapore Hit Awards Ceremony from 2005 to 2013.

Music
Teng was the lyricist of "Passerby/ Lu Ren Jia". It is Hong Kong singer Justin Lo's first ever Mandarin song. He has been a strong advocate of local music. In 2014, YES 933 dedicated a massive amount of air time to promote new local acts. Singapore Hit Awards 2014 also adopted a local theme.

Theatre
Teng was one of the supporting actors in Resonance, a Chinese theatre production commissioned for MediaCorp Radio's 75th anniversary. He was cast as a comedic radio presenter in the 1980s. He later appeared in the final scene in the 2000s as a middle-aged man.

Endorsements
Teng became the first male celebrity spokesperson for beauty chain, Bioskin in 2008. He was featured in the television commercials and print advertisements for the brand.

A year later, he was the spokesperson for Singtel AMPED, a digital music download service.

In 2015, he was named ambassador of Health Promotion Board’s anti-smoking campaign. This was after he stopped smoking in 2014.

Awards and nominations
Teng was nominated for five awards at the Golden Microphone Awards in 2004. He did not win any awards and expressed his disappointment in a newspaper interview. A few months later, the Singapore Hit Awards was created. Teng refused to do any promotion, but won "Most Friendly DJ". He won "Most Popular DJ" a year later, and has since continued to hold on to the title. During this period, the Chinese media in Singapore and Johor Bahru began to refer him as "No 1 Ah Ge" of Chinese radio.

Corporate

Mediacorp
Cruz Teng was made station head of YES 93.3FM in 2013, replacing Foong Wai See who was transferred to Love 97.2FM, another station in the MediaCorp group. During this period, he chaired the Singapore Hit Awards and Global Chinese Music Awards committees, and launched several new programmes and events, including Cycle to Supper.

NoonTalk Media & Frozen Age
Cruz Teng left YES 933 to join NoonTalk Media in November 2015. As Group Creative Director, he was to oversee the group’s creative direction and development of its products and artistes, including Dasmond Koh, Aloysius Pang, Xu Bin and Kimberly Chia. At the same time, Dasmond Koh did not renew his contract with Mediacorp when it expired in Jan 2016. Dasmond set up a new skincare line, Frozen Age, and Cruz was involved in its initial setup in Singapore and Malaysia.

SMRT
He was hired as  Lead, Internal Communications at SMRT in Aug 2016. According to his LinkedIn profile, he was promoted to Lead, Corporate Relations and Internal Communications in 2018. He left SMRT in Feb 2019.

Tan Chong International Ltd
Cruz Teng joined the Corporate Communications department of Tan Chong in Feb 2019.

Personal life
Teng was one of the earliest DJs to begin a blog. He was nominated for Best Celebrity Blog at the 1st Nuffnang Regional Blog Awards in 2009, Best Radio Personality Blog at the Singapore Radio Awards in 2010 and Best Local Celebrity Blog at the omy Blog Awards 2010. He was named Official Blogger for Singapore's National Day celebrations in 2009.

In 2007, Teng fell into a drain and broke five bones in his left foot. He was admitted to hospital and did a surgery the following day. A week later, fellow DJ Dennis Chew also met with an accident. He fell off a bicycle and fractured his arm and suffered other injuries on his face and legs. At that time, they were the only two male DJs in the station, and the event was later ranked as one of the Top 10 Local Entertainment Headlines in Singapore that year.

Long Distance Relationship
Teng admitted to a long-distance relationship on 933TV in 2015, but declined to give further details. In 2018, he said on social media that his ex had passed away. He followed up with several posts, including flying to Taiwan for the funeral in late 2018, and subsequent visits at the columbarium in Taiwan.

References

External links
Profile on xinmsn

Singaporean DJs
Living people
1979 births
Ngee Ann Polytechnic alumni
Singaporean people of Chinese descent